Villeneuve was a federal electoral district in Quebec, Canada, that was represented in the House of Commons of Canada from 1949 to 1979.

This riding was created in 1947 from parts of Pontiac riding. It consisted initially of:
 the southwestern part of the county of Abitibi; and
 parts of the county of Témiscamingue including the towns of Mercier, Noranda and Rouyn.

In 1952, it was redefined to consist of:
 parts of the county of Abitibi including the towns of Bourlamarque, Cadillac, Duparquet, Malartic and Val-d'Or;
 the northern parts of the county of Témiscamingue including the cities of Noranda and Rouyn.

In 1966, it was redefined to consist of:
 the Towns of Barville, Bourlamaque, Cadillac, Chapais, Chibougamau, Lebel-sur-Quévillon, Malartic, Senneterre and Val-d'Or;
 parts of the County of Abitibi; and
 parts of the County of Témiscamingue.

The electoral district was abolished in 1976 when it was redistributed into Abitibi and Témiscamingue ridings.

Members of Parliament

This riding elected the following Members of Parliament:

Election results

|Candidat des électeurs
|Réal Caouette
|align=right|8,129

|Candidat des électeurs
|Réal Caouette
|align=right|8,276

See also 

 List of Canadian federal electoral districts
 Past Canadian electoral districts

External links 
 Riding history from the Library of Parliament

Former federal electoral districts of Quebec